Bowden is a hamlet in the parish of Stoke Fleming in the South Hams district of Devon, England, about 1 mile (2 km) west of Stoke Fleming.
Bowden House was the seat of the Netherton family from about 1750.

References 

Hamlets in Devon
Stoke Fleming